Narvi  or Saturn XXXI is a natural satellite of Saturn. It was discovered by a team of astronomers led by Scott S. Sheppard in 2003, and given the temporary designation S/2003 S 1.

Description 
Narvi is about 7 kilometres in diameter, and orbits Saturn at an average distance of 19,371,000 km in 1006.541 days, at an inclination of 136.8° to the ecliptic (109° to Saturn's equator), in a retrograde direction and with an eccentricity of 0.2990, very similar to Bestla's orbit. Narvi's rotation period is  hours, and its light curve has three minima like Siarnaq and Ymir. Unlike the other triangular moons, however, one minimum is much higher than the others, and the maximum that is a half-period ahead is much lower.

Naming 
It was named in January 2005 after Narfi, a giant in Norse mythology. The name was approved by the IAU Working Group on Planetary System Nomenclature on 21 January 2005.

References

External links 
 IAU Working Group for Planetary System Nomenclature
 IAUC 8116: Satellites of Jupiter and Saturn April 11, 2003 (discovery)
 MPEC 2003-G39: S/2003 S 1 April 8, 2003 (discovery and ephemeris)
 IAUC 8471: Satellites of Saturn January 21, 2005 (naming the moon)

Norse group
Moons of Saturn
Irregular satellites
Discoveries by Scott S. Sheppard
Astronomical objects discovered in 2003
Moons with a retrograde orbit